Brockmann is a name that can be used as a given name, middle name, or surname.

People with the surname Brockmann 
Andreas Brockmann (born 1967), German field hockey player
Anke Brockmann (born 1988), German field hockey player
"Bassy" Bob Brockmann (born 1962), American record producer
Dirk Brockmann (born 1969), German physicist
Elena Brockmann (1867–1946), Swiss painter
Gottfried Brockmann (1903–1983), German artist, professor
Henrik Brockmann (born 1967), Danish heavy metal singer
Hermanus Brockmann (1871–1936), Dutch coxswain
Josef Müller-Brockmann, (1914–1996), Swiss graphic designer and teacher
Julius von Raatz-Brockmann (1870–1944), German baritone singer
Marie Brockmann-Jerosch (1877–1952), Swiss botanist
Miguel d'Escoto Brockmann (1933–2017), American-born Nicaraguan diplomat, politician, and Catholic priest
Reiner Brockmann (1609–1647), German pastor
Suzanne Brockmann (born 1960), American romantic fiction writer

People with the middle name Brockmann 
Brock Long (born as William Brockmann Long, born 1975), American emergency manager who served as the Administrator of the Federal Emergency Management Agency (FEMA)

See also
Brockmann body, endocrine organ
Brockman